WZMC-LP, UHF analog channel 35, was a low-powered television station licensed to Jackson, Tennessee, United States. The station was owned by New Moon Communications.

History
From its inception in 1987 until the end of the station's existence, it was a TBN owned-and-operated translator. It first broadcast under a translator-style callsign, W35AH. The actual date of the call letter change to the current WZMC-LP is unknown, but it most likely happened between 1994 and 2011, because 1994 was when low-power TV stations were first allowed to use traditional callsigns.

After being donated to Minority Media and Telecommunications Council, the station was sold to New Moon Communications, and it has since gone silent. The sale to New Moon was part of a package deal that also included former TBN repeaters W41BN (later WDON-LP, now WRGX-LD) in Dothan, Alabama; KJNE-LP in Jonesboro, Arkansas; and KUMK-LP in Ottumwa, Iowa. It was going to return to the air as an NBC affiliate, but New Moon Communications surrendered the license for WZMC-LP on July 30, 2013. Because of that, WMC-TV in Memphis and, to a lesser extent, WSMV-TV in Nashville, remained the default NBC affiliates for the Jackson, Tennessee market. The northernmost part of the market had WPSD-TV in Paducah, Kentucky for NBC until the 2009 digital television transition. NBC programming was never available directly from Jackson until 2014 when WNBJ-LD signed on as a new NBC affiliate in Jackson.

References

External links
New Moon Communications

ZMC-LP
Defunct television stations in the United States
Television channels and stations established in 1987
1987 establishments in Tennessee
Television channels and stations disestablished in 2013
2013 disestablishments in Tennessee
ZMC-LP